European Parliament elections were held in Denmark on 10 June 1999 to elect the 16 Danish members of the European Parliament.

Results
Seats were allocated first by the D'Hondt method to electoral coalitions (Venstre + Conservative People's Party + Centre Democrats; June Movement + People's Movement against the EU) and the remaining parties by themselves; then subsequently between the parties in each coalition.

See also
List of members of the European Parliament for Denmark, 1999–2004

References

Denmark
European Parliament elections in Denmark
Europe